Jean Tricart (16 September 1920 – 6 May 2003) was a French geomorphologist. In 1948 he became professor at the University of Strasbourg where he remained for the rest of his career. The Tricart's doctoral thesis dealt with the Paris Basin and resulted in a publication acclaimed in France. He collaborated often with his friend André Cailleux. Beginning in 1962 he and Callieux published a band of five works on the subject of geomorphology and climate, publishing the last one in 1974. The bulk of his works were published in French.

Tricart considered that he had, 'a broad systems approach to landform genesis.'. This paper is response to Denys Brunsden's 'Tablets of Stone'.

References

Further reading
 

Climatic geomorphologists
French geomorphologists
1920 births
2003 deaths
Academic staff of the University of Strasbourg
Founding members of the World Cultural Council